Vincennes Fortnightly Club is a historic Women's club clubhouse located at Vincennes, Knox County, Indiana.  It was built in 1928, and is a two-story, Colonial Revival style brick and Indiana limestone building.  The tripartite front facade features arched openings and a decorative metal railed balcony on the second floor.  The dumbbell shaped building consists of a main entrance block, auditorium, and rear stage section.

It was added to the National Register of Historic Places in 2000.

References

Women's clubs in the United States
Vincennes, Indiana
Clubhouses on the National Register of Historic Places in Indiana
Colonial Revival architecture in Indiana
Buildings and structures completed in 1928
Buildings and structures in Knox County, Indiana
National Register of Historic Places in Knox County, Indiana
1928 establishments in Indiana
History of women in Indiana